HNT Chicken (short for "Hot 'n' Tender") is a Brazilian fast-food chain incorporated in 2014 by Dany Levkovits. Its first store located in Rio de Janeiro opened in 1995. The company has 39 chains across eight Brazilian states. The company began looking toward expansion in 2015 and opened its first United States expansion in Philadelphia in December 2019.

History
The first restaurant was opened in 1995 in Rio de Janeiro and expanded to 39 locations across Brazil. The chain was incorporated in 2014 and its CEO is Dany Levkovits. After looking to expand in 2015, the company established a venture with 19-year-old Ronak Pandya, son of entrepreneur and restaurateur Jay Pandya, who owns dozens of restaurants in New Jersey, New York and Connecticut. Private equity fund, Moonbeam Capital Investments, is funding HNT's expansion into the United States East Coast.

The company is projected to open 65 locations "by the end of 2020 and 100 by June 2021". The franchise is expected to open 1,000 jobs. Between 40-50 locations are expected to open in the Philadelphia region. The first restaurant expansion in the region opened in December 2019 near Philadelphia Mills.

See also
 List of chicken restaurants

References

External links
 

Fast-food chains of Brazil
Food and drink companies based in Rio de Janeiro (city)
Regional restaurant chains in the United States
Restaurants established in 1995
Brazilian brands
Fast-food poultry restaurants
1995 establishments in Brazil